Absentee is the debut album by American metal band Pitch Black Forecast.

Track listing
All tracks by Pitch Black Forecast except where noted
"Atonement" – 3:10
"Dialtone" – 3:33
"Wrapped in Plastic" – 2:37 (feat. Human Furnace)
"Lighthouse" – 4:15
"Ornament" – 2:50
"Halt" – 3:06
"Breathe Now" – 3:20
"So Low" – 2:56 (feat. Randy Blythe)
"Desperation Angel" – 3:42
"Creepy Crawl" – 4:26
"Bad Reputation" (Thin Lizzy cover) – 3:31 (feat. Human Furnace)

Personnel 
Jason Popson – vocals
Craig Martini – bass
Robert Reinard – guitar
Gene Hoglan – drums

Additional personnel
D. Randall Blythe – guest vocals
Human Furnace – guest vocals
Andrew Cushman – guitars on "Bad Reputation"
Derek Hess – cover art
Stephen Kasner – artwork
Bill Korecky – engineering & mixing
Roger Lian – mastering

References

Pitch Black Forecast albums
2008 albums